The Bangladesh Wushu Federation is the national federation for Wushu and is responsible for governing the sport in Bangladesh. Abdus Sobhan Golap, Member of Parliament, is the president and Md. Dulal Hossain is the general secretary of the federation.

History
Bangladesh Wushu Federation was established in 2007 as the Bangladesh Wushu Association. In 2018, Bangladesh Wushu Association was renamed to Bangladesh Wushu Federation by the National Sports Council.

References

Wushu in Bangladesh
Wushu governing bodies
2007 establishments in Bangladesh
Sports organizations established in 2007
Wushu
Organisations based in Dhaka